The 1883 Men's tennis tour was the eighth annual tennis tour, consisting of 63 tournaments. The Wimbledon Championships was won by William Renshaw for the third consecutive year, while Richard Sears continued his dominance at the U.S. National Championships also winning a third successive title. Other big winners this season were Ernest Renshaw, picking up the Irish Championships, Herbert Wilberforce winning the Northern Lawn Tennis Championships in Manchester, and Herbert Lawford collecting his second and final title at the Princes Club Championships. The title leader this season was Charles Walder Grinstead winning 5 tournaments from 6 finals.

The tour began in May in Dublin in Ireland and ended in November in Melbourne, Australia.

Calendar 
Notes 1: Challenge round: the final round of a tournament, in which the winner of a single-elimination phase faces the previous year's champion, who plays only that one match. The challenge round was used in the early history of tennis (from 1877 through 1921), in some tournaments not all.* Indicates challenger
Notes 2:Tournaments in italics were events that were staged only once that season

Key

January 
No event

February 
No event

March 
No event

May

June

July

August

September

October

November

December 
No Events

Tournament winners 
Note: important tournaments in bold

Rankings 

Source: The Concise History of Tennis

Notes

References

Sources 
 Ayre's Lawn Tennis Almanack And Tournament Guide, 1908 to 1938, A. Wallis Myers.
 British Lawn Tennis and Squash Magazine, 1948 to 1967, British Lawn Tennis Ltd, UK.
 Dunlop Lawn Tennis Almanack And Tournament Guide, G.P. Hughes, 1939 to 1958, Dunlop Sports Co. Ltd, UK
 Lawn tennis and Badminton Magazine, 1906 to 1973, UK.
 Lowe's Lawn Tennis Annuals and Compendia, Lowe, Sir F. Gordon, Eyre & Spottiswoode
 Spalding's Lawn Tennis Annuals from 1885 to 1922, American Sports Pub. Co, USA.
 Sports Around the World: History, Culture, and Practice, Nauright John and Parrish Charles, (2012), ABC-CLIO, Santa Barbara, Cal, US, .
 
 
 The Tennis Book, edited by Michael Bartlett and Bob Gillen, Arbor House, New York, 1981 
 The World of Tennis Annuals, Barrett John, 1970 to 2001.
 Total Tennis:The Ultimate Tennis Encyclopedia, by Bud Collins, Sport Classic Books, Toronto, Canada, 
 Wright & Ditson Officially Adopted Lawn Tennis Guide's 1890 to 1920 Wright & Ditsons Publishers, Boston, Mass, USA.
 http://www.tennisarchives.com/Tournaments 1883
 https://app.thetennisbase.com/1883 Men's Tennis season
 Tornei di tennis maschili nel 1883

External links 
 http://www.tennisarchives.com/
 https://thetennisbase.com/

Pre Open era tennis seasons
1883 in tennis